The JTS engine (Jet Thrust Stoichiometric) is a gasoline direct injection engine produced by Alfa Romeo. It exists in two forms, straight-4 and V6, and was introduced into the Alfa lineup in 2002.

Four-cylinder

2.0

The JTS engine debuted in 2002 in the Alfa Romeo 156. The engine was based on the 2.0 Twin Spark (itself a variant of the Pratola Serra engine family), replacing Twin Spark with direct injection, dubbed "Jet Thrust Stoichiometric". In 2003, this engine was introduced to the GTV/Spider coupé and roadster and it was fitted to the GT from launch.
In spite of its benefits to power, torque and economy, the JTS was not used in the smaller 147 or the larger 166, and much less in other models from the Fiat Group. This was allegedly because the JTS engine cost a lot more to produce than the Twin Spark.

Displacement: 
Power:  @ 6400 rpm
Torque:  @ 3250 rpm

Applications:
2002-2005 Alfa Romeo 156
2003-2004 Alfa Romeo GTV & Spider
2004–2010 Alfa Romeo GT

1.9

It was only in 2005, with the arrival of the 159, that more variants of the JTS were produced. The 1.9 JTS and 2.2 JTS form part of a new engine family and are completely different from the 2.0 JTS. Both 1.9 L and 2.2 L have chain driven camshafts and variable valve timing on both inlet and exhaust camshafts. Both 1.9 and 2.2 JTS engine blocks were supplied by GM to the Fiat group and belong to the GM Ecotec engine family. Both models are mapped to either a six-speed manual gearbox plus a reverse gear, or a Formula One inspired sequential gearbox also having six gears and reverse.

Displacement: 
Power:  @ 6500 rpm
Torque:  @ 4500 rpm

Applications:
2005–2011 Alfa Romeo 159

2.2

With the arrival of 159, a 2.2 JTS was also introduced. The engine block is sourced from GM (Ecotec L61).

Displacement: 
Power:  @ 6500 rpm
Torque:  @ 4500 rpm
Compression Ratio: 11:3:1

Applications:
2005–2010 Alfa Romeo 159
2005–2010 Alfa Romeo Brera
2006–2010 Alfa Romeo Spider

Six-cylinder

3.2

The JTS direct injection system was first used in a V6 engine in 2005 with the introduction of the Alfa 159 and Brera. This is not related to the Alfa Romeo V6 engine, but is instead a derivation of the GM High Feature engine; built in Australia by GM Holden. While it retains the High Feature engine's  bore x stroke and chain driven camshafts, it is modified by Alfa for their performance, fuel economy and sound characteristics. These modifications include: "TwinPhaser" variable valve timing (cam-phasing on both inlet and exhaust cams, thus the name), gasoline direct injection and a higher compression ratio of 11.25:1. It also operates with a lean burn system up to about 1500 rpm, as on many other engines from the company and is capable of generating , a number matching the larger LY7 3.6 L variant used by GM. Alfa Romeo stopped using the V6 JTS engine in 2010.

Displacement: 
Power:  at 6200 rpm
Torque:  at 3800 rpm

Applications:
2004 Alfa Romeo Visconti (concept car)
2005–2010 Alfa Romeo 159
2005–2010 Alfa Romeo Brera
2006–2010 Alfa Romeo Spider

References

Fiat engines
Gasoline engines by model